The Sony ZV-1 is a 20MP Sony  compact digital camera with a 1-inch image sensor. It is similar to the Sony RX100 with extra features, such as features for vlogging and quick video production. The camera can record video in XAVC S and AVCHD formats. The camera was released in May 2020 as part of Sony's ZV line-up. Its launch price was $799, but it was $749 when pre-ordering it and it's currently $749. This was the first camera in the Sony ZV line-up. The camera comes in two different colours, black or white. It also comes in a vlogging kit as an optional extra. The camera is likely a successor to the RX100 Mark VII, as Sony hadn't released a RX100 since 2019.

Specifications
The ZV-1 has the following specifications:
 F-stop: F1.8-2.8
 Retractable lens
 Zoom range: 24-70mm
 Phase detection autofocus
 Video: 4K at up to 30fps, 1080p at up to 120fps; high-speed photography up to 960fps (at lower resolutions)
 Wireless: Wi-Fi, Bluetooth (for wireless control and GPS geotagging)
 ISO: 125-6400
 Compatible with Sony GP-VPT2BT selfie-stick/tripod
 Raw image format (ARW)
 Directional microphone, along with a microphone jack.
 Micro-USB charging port
 Mini HDMi port
 Flash hotshoe
 Swivel touchscreen display

References

Digital cameras